The Movies is the tenth studio album of Croatian pianist Maksim Mrvica.

Track listing
 Mission Impossible/Theme (Lalo Schifrin/Danny Elfman)
 The Godfather/Love Theme (Nino Rota)
 Pirates of the Caribbean/He's a Pirate (Klaus Badelt)
 Gladiator/Now We Are Free (Hans Zimmer)
 The Glass Mountain/Legend of the Glass Mountain (Nino Rota)	
 Snow Flower (Ryoki Matsumoto)	
 Larah's Choice/Providenza (Tonči Huljić) 	
 Rocky/Gonna Fly Now (Bill Conti)	
 Rollerball/ Bach's Toccata & Fugue (André Previn)	
 Amélie/La Valse D'Amélie(Yann Tiersen)	
 The Piano/The Heart Asks Pleasure First (Michael Nyman)	
 Spartacus/Love Theme (Alex North)

2012 albums
Maksim Mrvica albums